Guirsch Castle is a château in the village of Guirsch near Arlon, in the Province of Luxembourg, Wallonia, Belgium. The present buildings, surrounded by a large formal garden, were constructed between 1749 and 1763 and are the property of the de Wykerslooth de Rooyesteyn family. There is no public access.

See also
List of castles in Belgium
Guirsch Castle Tourist office of Arlon

Castles in Belgium
Castles in Luxembourg (Belgium)
Arlon